Église Sainte-Marthe de Tarascon or Collégiale Royale Sainte-Marthe is a collegiate church in Tarascon, France, dedicated to Saint Martha. It is where, according to a local tradition, the biblical figure Martha is buried.

History
Collegiate Sainte-Marthe was dedicated in 1197 and enlarged in the 14th and 15th centuries. It was built half-Romanesque in the 12th century and half-Gothic in the 14th century.

The tympanum and lintel of the Romanesque southern portal were severely damaged during the French Revolution.

The tip of the church tower was destroyed during Allied bombings on August 16, 1944. It was later rebuilt.

Features
The crypt dates from the 3rd century. It houses the relics of Martha in a sarcophagus of the 4th century.

Church paintings include:

Painting by Charles-André van Loo:
 Mort de Saint François or Saint François d'Assise recevant les stigmates (1730)
 Sainte Marthe domptant la Tarasque (1730). Originally in the convent of the Capuchins and later in Eglise Saint-Jacques.

Paintings by Joseph-Marie Vien. Based on the narrative of the Golden Legend, they were initially part of a series painted for the convent of the Capuchins in Tarascon.
 Sainte Marthe recevant le Christ à Bethanie (1747)
 La résurrection de Lazare (1747)
 L'embarquement de sainte Marthe (1751)
 L'arrivée de sainte Marthe en Provence (1748)
 La prédication de sainte Marthe (1748)
 L'agonie de sainte Marthe (1748)
 Les funérailles de sainte Marthe (1748)

Paintings by Nicolas Mignard:
 L'Assomption (1643)
 Arrivée du Christ à Béthanie (1640)

Paintings by Pierre Parrocel:
 Sainte Cunégonde et sainte Cécile
 Sainte Marie l'égyptienne
 Le Christ sur la croix
 Sainte Catherine de Sienne
 Saint Thomas d'Aquin
 Adoration des Mages
 Adoration des Bergers
 L'Annonciation
 Notre Dame du peuple

Painting by Philippe Sauvan:
 Saint Dominique (1789)

References

Further reading

External links

 Church of Saint Martha , Tarascon Monuments and Museums, Official website of Tarascon's tourist office.
 Collégiale Sainte-Marthe /  Tarascon
 Collégiale Sainte Marthe
 Entry at pays-arles.org 

Tarascon
Tarascon
Tarascon
Tarascon